FileMaker is a cross-platform relational database application from Claris International, a subsidiary of Apple Inc. It integrates a database engine with a graphical user interface (GUI) and security features, allowing users to modify a database by dragging new elements into layouts, screens, or forms. It is available in desktop, server, iOS and web-delivery configurations.

FileMaker Pro, the desktop app, evolved from a DOS application, originally called simply FileMaker, but was then developed primarily for the Apple Macintosh and released in April 1985. It was rebranded as FileMaker Pro in 1990. Since 1992 it has been available for Microsoft Windows and for the classic Mac OS and macOS, and can be used in a cross-platform environment.

FileMaker Go, the mobile app, was released for iOS devices in July 2010.

FileMaker Server allows centralized hosting of apps which can be used by clients running the desktop or mobile apps. It is also available hosted by Claris, called FileMaker Cloud.

History 
FileMaker began as an MS-DOS-based computer program named Nutshell – developed by Nashoba Systems of Concord, Massachusetts, in the early 1980s. Nutshell was distributed by Leading Edge, an electronics marketing company that had recently started selling IBM PC-compatible computers.

With the introduction of the Macintosh, Nashoba combined the basic data engine with a new forms-based graphical user interface (GUI). Leading Edge was not interested in newer versions, preferring to remain a DOS-only vendor, and kept the Nutshell name. Nashoba found another distributor, Forethought Inc., and introduced the program on the Macintosh platform as FileMaker in April 1985. When Apple introduced the Macintosh Plus in 1986 the next version of FileMaker was named FileMaker Plus to reflect the new model's name.

Forethought was purchased by Microsoft, which was then introducing their PowerPoint product that became part of Microsoft Office. Microsoft had introduced its own database application, Microsoft File, shortly before FileMaker, but was outsold by FileMaker and therefore Microsoft File was discontinued. Microsoft negotiated with Nashoba for the right to publish FileMaker, but Nashoba decided to self-publish the next version, FileMaker 4.

Purchase by Claris 
Shortly thereafter, Apple Computer formed Claris, a wholly owned subsidiary, to market software. Claris purchased Nashoba to round out its software suite. By then, Leading Edge and Nutshell had faded from the marketplace because of competition from other DOS- and later Windows-based database products. FileMaker, however, continued to succeed on the Macintosh platform.

Claris changed the product's name to FileMaker II to conform to its naming scheme for other products, such as MacWrite II, but the product changed little from the last Nashoba version. Several minor versions followed.

In 1990, the product was released as FileMaker Pro 1.0. And in September 1992, Claris released a cross-platform version for both the Mac and Windows; except for a few platform-specific functions, the program's features and user interface were the same. Up to this point FileMaker had no real relational capabilities; it was limited to automatically looking up and importing values from other files. It only had the ability to save a state—a filter and a sort, and a layout for the data. Version 3.0, released around 1995, introduced new relational and scripting features.

By 1995, FileMaker Pro was the only strong-selling product in Claris's lineup. In 1998, Apple moved development of some of the other Claris products in-house, dropped most of the rest, and changed Claris's name to FileMaker Inc., to concentrate on that product.

In 2020, FileMaker International Inc. changed its name (back) to Claris International Inc. and announced Claris Connect workflow software.

Later updates 
Version 4.0, introduced in 1997, added a plug-in architecture much like that of Adobe Photoshop, which enabled third-party developers to add features to FileMaker. A bundled plug-in, the Web Companion, allowed the database to act as a web server. Other plug-ins added features to the interface and enabled FileMaker to serve as an FTP client, perform external file operations, and send messages to remote FileMaker files over the Internet or an intranet.

Version 5 introduced a new file format (file extension ).

Version 7, released in 2004, introduced a new file format (file extension ) supporting file sizes up to 8 terabytes (an increase from the 2 gigabytes allowed in previous versions). Individual fields could hold up to 4 gigabytes of binary data (container fields) or 2 gigabytes of 2-byte Unicode text per record (up from 64 kilobytes in previous versions). FileMaker's relational model was expanded, offering multiple tables per file and a graphical relationship editor that displayed and allowed manipulation of related tables in a manner that resembled the entity-relationship diagram format. Accompanying these important changes, FileMaker Inc. also introduced a developer certification program.

In 2005 FileMaker Inc. announced the FileMaker 8 product family, which offered the developer an expanded feature set. These included a tabbed interface, script variables, tooltips, enhanced debugging, custom menus, and the ability to copy and paste entire tables and field definitions, scripts, and script steps within and between files. Version 8.5, released in 2006, added an integrated web viewer (with the ability to view such things as shipment tracking information from FedEx and Wikipedia entries) and named layout objects.

FileMaker 9, released on July 10, 2007, introduced a quick-start screen, conditional formatting, fluid layout auto-resizing, hyperlinked pointers into databases, and external SQL links. FileMaker 10 was released on January 5, 2009, before that year's Macworld Conference & Expo, and offered scripts that can be triggered by user actions and a redesigned user interface similar to that of Mac OS X Leopard (10.5) applications.

FileMaker 11, released on March 9, 2010, introduced charting, which was further streamlined in FileMaker 12, released April 4, 2012. That version also added themes, more database templates (so-called starter solutions) and simplified creation of iOS databases. FileMaker Go 11 (July 20, 2010) and FileMaker Go 12 for iPhone and iPad (April 4, 2012) allow only the creation, modification, and deletion of records on these handheld devices.  Design and schema changes must be made within the full FileMaker Pro application. FileMaker Go 12 offers multitasking, improved media integration, export of data to multiple formats and enhanced container fields.

FileMaker 13, released after the launches of iOS 7 and OS X Mavericks (10.9), first shipped in December 2013. The client and server products were enhanced to support many mobile and web methods of data access. FileMaker Go 13, the parallel iPad–iPhone product, has now become a single client for both devices, and the Server Admin tool now runs in HTML5, no longer requiring a Java app.

FileMaker 14 platform released on May 15, 2015. This included FileMaker Pro 14, FileMaker Pro 14 Advanced, FileMaker Server 14 and FileMaker Go 14. This was followed by version 15 in May 2016 and version 16 in May 2017; both including equivalent Pro, Pro Advanced, Server and Go versions.

In late 2016, FileMaker began annually publicizing a software roadmap of future features they are working on as well as identifying features they are moving away from or may deprecate in the near future.

FileMaker Inc. had always had a hard time describing what FileMaker software is because it is more than just a database; it includes the user interface, security, rapid application development tools, etc. FileMaker Inc. initiated a new marketing program at their annual developers conference in August 2018 to address its poor description categories: "Workplace Innovation Platform".

FileMaker Cloud 

On September 27, 2016, FileMaker Cloud was introduced, including a Linux server (CentOS), which was offered exclusively through the Amazon Marketplace. In November 2019, FileMaker Cloud was reintroduced as a software as a service product offered directly from Claris for FileMaker Pro 18.0.3 using FileMaker Server Cloud 2.18 service on Amazon servers, but managed by Claris instead of through the Amazon Marketplace, and making use of the new FileMaker ID authentication.

Linux and Docker 
In October 2020, Claris released a Linux version of FileMaker Server, first on CentOS (19.1) then on Ubuntu (19.2).

Version history 

 
* (*) indicates both FileMaker Pro/FileMaker Pro Advanced (Developer Edition in v4-6) or FileMaker Server/FileMaker Server Advanced

FileMaker files are compatible between Mac and Windows. File type extensions are:
  since FileMaker Pro 2.0
  since FileMaker Pro 3.0
  since FileMaker Pro 5.0 (including 5, 5.5, 6.0)
  since FileMaker Pro 7.0 (including 7, 8, 8.5, 9, 10, 11 and FileMaker Go 1.0)
  since FileMaker Pro 12 (including 12, 13, 14, 15, 16, 17, 18, 19)

Self-running applications (runtime, kiosk mode) are platform-specific only.

Internationalization and localization
FileMaker is available in worldwide English, Simplified Chinese, Dutch, French, German, Italian, Japanese, Korean, Brazilian Portuguese, Spanish, and Swedish.

There are also specific versions of FileMaker for users of Central European, Indian and Middle Eastern languages. These versions offer spellchecking, data entry, sorting and printing options for languages of the respective region. They also contain localized templates and localized instant web publishing.

The Central European version FileMaker includes English, Russian, Polish, Czech and Turkish interfaces. There are customized templates for Russian, Polish, Czech, Turkish. In addition Russian, Greek, Estonian, Lithuanian, Latvian, Serbian, Bulgarian and Hungarian are supported to varying degrees.

The version intended for Southeast Asian languages has only an English user interface, but supports Indic-language data entry, sorting and indexing in Hindi, Marathi, Bengali, Panjabi, Gujarati, Tamil, Telugu, Kannada and Malayalam.

Similarly, the Middle Eastern version has only English and French user interfaces, but with its option to change the text direction to right-to-left, it does support Arabic and Hebrew data entry.

Scripting 

FileMaker Pro and FileMaker Pro Advanced include scripting capabilities and many built-in functions for automation of common tasks and complex calculations. Numerous steps are available for navigation, conditional execution of script steps, editing records, and other utilities. FileMaker Pro Advanced provides a script debugger which allows the developer to set break points, monitor data values and step through script lines.

FileMaker 13 introduced a script that more deeply queries container field document metadata.

Dynamic Markup Language
The FileMaker Dynamic Markup Language or FDML was a markup language used in the earlier versions of FileMaker introduced in 1998. FDML is also often referred to as Claris Dynamic Markup Language or CDML, named after its former company Claris. FDML was an extension of HTML that used special tags, such as [FMP-Record][/FMP-Record] to display FileMaker data on Web pages. FileMaker officially dropped support for FDML in 2004.

SQL and ODBC support 
Since version 9, FileMaker has had the ability to connect to a number of SQL databases without resorting to using SQL, including MySQL, SQL Server, and Oracle. This requires installation of the SQL database ODBC driver (in many cases a third-party license per client driver) to connect to a SQL database. Through Extended SQL Services (ESS), SQL databases can be used as data sources in FileMaker's relationship graph, thus allowing the developer to create new layouts based on the SQL database; create, edit, and delete SQL records via FileMaker layouts and functions; and reference SQL fields in FileMaker calculations and script steps. It is a cross-platform relational database application.

Versions from FileMaker Pro 5.5 onwards also have an ODBC interface.

FileMaker 12 introduced a new function, ExecuteSQL, which allows the user to perform an SQL query against the FileMaker database to retrieve data, but does not allow data modification or deletion, or schema changes.

FileMaker allows non-numeric characters to be stored in its "numeric" field type unless the field is specifically marked as strictly "numeric".

Through a third party, Actual Technologies, FileMaker 15 and forward ,also, support ODBC connectivity to IBM I 7.3 (AS/400), IBM Db2 11.1, and PostgreSQL 9.6.12. Using the Actual Adapter, these ODBC connections can also make ESS connections and be used as sources in the Relationship Graph.

Integration 

FileMaker 16 provides integrations via cURL, JSON, REST-based FileMaker Data API support. Tableau Web Data Connector is offered to visualize FileMaker data. The REST-based API license is a free trial that expired September 27, 2018. FileMaker 17 offers a permanent REST-based Data API. Standard licensing include 2GB of outbound data per user per month. Container data does not count towards this limit, and inbound Data API data transfer is unlimited. FileMaker 19 for Linux and FileMaker Cloud provide a OData gateway, allowing JSON and XML output (Atom).

See also 
 Bento, a simplified personal database application from FileMaker Inc. (discontinued mid-2013)

References

External links 
 

Content management systems
Collaborative software
Document management systems
Database engines
Proprietary database management systems
Desktop database application development tools
IOS software
MacOS database-related software
Classic Mac OS software
Windows database-related software
Cross-platform software
Mobile software